The High School for Environmental Studies (HSES) is located the Hell's Kitchen (or Clinton) neighborhood of Manhattan in New York City. The school was once a Fox Film movie studio.

In 1992, the High School for Environmental Studies opened its doors in the building that formerly housed Stuyvesant High School in the East Village on East 15th Street and First Avenue in Manhattan. 150 freshmen students attended the school in its first year. HSES was established in response to a growing consciousness of environmental issues and in anticipation of a rapidly expanding field of environmental professions.

References

External links
 

Public high schools in Manhattan
1992 establishments in New York City
Educational institutions established in 1992
Hell's Kitchen, Manhattan